Skatterman & Snug Brim is a rap duo from Kansas City, Missouri, United States, best known for their song "Block Party".

After releasing projects separately, Skatterman (born Stacy Dewayne Landis) and Snug Brim (born Aaron R. Henderson) combined as a group. The duo released their first album, Worth A Million, in 2002 through Below Radar Records. On the cover they were listed as "Skatterman & Snug Brim," but the inside of the case displayed "Skatterman & Snug Brim AKA Yung Gunz." The "Yung Gunz" name was later dropped due to a conflict with another group of the same name, but different spelling, (Young Gunz).

After the release of their first album, the duo signed with the Kansas City-based label, Strange Music. They recorded the album, Urban Legendz which was released in 2004. The single from the album, "Block Party," charted #24 on Billboards Hot R&B/Hip-Hop Singles Sales in October of the same year.

Word on tha Streets was released August 12, 2008. The follow up to their Urban Legendz album featured the songs: "I'm That Nigga", "Sukka Dukkas" and "Heartbreaker." Featured artists included Tech N9ne, Young Buck, Paul Wall and Rich The Factor.

On February 9, 2009, Tech N9ne's official website announced the duo's decision to leave the Strange Music label after fulfilling their commitment.

Bigg Shot Music & Films

On February 23, Skatterman & Snug Brim issued a press release through their MySpace account confirming that they had left the Strange Music label after fulfilling their two-album commitment. The duo also revealed that they had started a new label, Bigg Shot Music & Films''', with Skatterman acting as President / CEO and Snug Brim handling the Creative / A&R aspect of the company.

Plans for a new Skatterman & Snug Brim album were also included in this release, indicating that their third album Perseverance would be released through the label on September 1 via a two-album distribution deal with RYKO/Warner Bros. However, plans for the album were later dropped due to Snug Brim's decision to go back to school and work towards a 15-month certification in music marketing. Skatterman also moved forward with work on a solo mixtape titled The Cookbook, released on November 2, 2009. The mixtape will be followed by his studio album, Self Made scheduled for release on March 16, 2010.

Discography
Studio albums

Solo releases
Skatterman
1998: Southside Rollers2009: The Cook Book: Recipe 12012: The Cook Book: Recipe TwoSnug Brim
1998: Center Piece Of The Puzzle2001: Snug Brim Presents Murder 1 Rebelz2009: Hood GospelMusic videos
2007: Get It (by Snug Brim) (Directed by Kirk "KoBayne")
2008: Ups And Downs (Directed by "The Ebonie Jeneus")

Features
2013: Bloodstepp - Putcha Hands Up Again (Featuring Skatterman & Snug Brim) from the album Bass and Bubblegum2014: Bloodstepp - Putcha Hands Up Again (Featuring Skatterman & Snug Brim) (Chopped And Skrewed By DJ Mad Hatter) from the album Grand Theft Ufo: Floppy Disk Edition''

References

External links
Official Website

African-American musical groups
American musical duos
Hip hop duos
Midwest hip hop groups
Musical groups from Kansas City, Missouri